Café mocha - Uta no Ki is an album recorded by Japanese pop artist Watanabe Misato. It was released on March 2, 2002 by Sony Music Entertainment.

Track listing

Do you really want to hurt me
やさしく歌って～Killing me softly with his song～
蘇州夜曲
We're all alone
闇夜の国から
Eternal Flame
恋のバカンス
あなたのとりこ ～Irrésistiblement～
悲しくてやりきれない
翼をください
Moon river

External links 
Sony Music Entertainment - Official site for Watanabe Misato. 
Album Page - Direct link to page with song listing and music samples.

2002 albums
Misato Watanabe albums